Chilean Brazilians (Spanish: Chileno-brasileños) are Brazilian citizens of full, partial, or predominantly Chilean ancestry or Chile-born people who reside in Brazil.

Emigration of Chileans has decreased during the last decade: It is estimated that 857,781 Chileans live abroad, 50.1% of those being in Argentina (the highest number), 13.3% in Brazil and 8.8% in the United States.

See also

 Immigration to Brazil
 Chilean people
 Spanish immigration to Brazil

References

 
Ethnic groups in Brazil
Brazil